On the Fast Horse  is a play written and directed by Mohsen Moeini and produced by Negin Mirhasani Vahed. It went on stage in Milad Tower, Iran in 2014 and was the first play to be staged there.. One of the distinguishing features of the play is the utilization of novel visual techniques, which were used for the first time in Iranian theater. It is adapted from Ganjīnat al-asrār by Amman Samani.

Cast
 Mehdi Faghih
 Changiz Jalilvand
  Pardis Afkari

References

2014 plays